Southland is a Los Angeles Times best-selling novel and "Best book of 2003" by Nina Revoyr. It focuses on quest for the past and present of racial justice in Los Angeles. The novel is also a Book Sense 76 pick, an Edgar Award finalist, and the winner of the Ferro-Grumley Award and the Lambda Literary Award. Publishers Weekly called it "Compelling... never lacking in detail and authentic atmosphere, the novel cements Revoyr's reputation as one of the freshest young chroniclers of life in L.A.

References

2003 American novels

Novels set in Los Angeles
Novels about racism
Lambda Literary Award-winning works
American LGBT novels
Akashic Books books